The suspensory ligament of axilla, or Gerdy's ligament, is a suspensory ligament that connects the clavipectoral fascia to the axillary fascia. This union shapes the axilla (underarm).

References

Ligaments of the upper limb